In , the EPA established four Toxicity Categories for acute hazards of pesticide products, with "Category I" being the highest toxicity category (toxicity class). Most human hazard, precautionary statements, and human personal protective equipment statements are based upon the Toxicity Category of the pesticide product as sold or distributed. In addition, toxicity categories may be used for regulatory purposes other than labeling, such as classification for restricted use and requirements for child-resistant packaging. 

In certain cases, statements based upon the Toxicity Category of the product as diluted for use are also permitted. A Toxicity Category is assigned for each of five types of acute exposure, as specified in the table below.

Overview

The four toxicity categories, from one to four are:

Toxicity category I is highly toxic and severely irritating,
Toxicity category II is moderately toxic and moderately irritating,
Toxicity category III is slightly toxic and slightly irritating,
Toxicity category IV is practically non-toxic and not an irritant.

Acute toxicity categories for pesticide products
In the following table, the leftmost column lists the route of administration.

References

Toxicology
United States administrative law
United States Environmental Protection Agency
Environmental law in the United States
Rating systems